Brad Roberts (born c. 2000) is an American football running back for the Air Force Falcons.

He attended Ralston Valley High School in Arvada, Colorado, receiving first-team All-Colorado honors as a senior.

Roberts enrolled in the United States Air Force Academy in 2019, but did not see game action as a freshman. As a sophomore in 2020, he led Air Force with 461 rushing yards in four games, an average of 115.2 yards per game.  He rushed for a career-high 177 yards and three touchdowns against New Mexico on November 20, 2020.

As a junior in 2021, he rushed for 142 yards against New Mexico and added another 140 yards the following week against Wyoming. He finished the 2021 regular season with 1,279 rushing yards, eighth best among all Division I FBS players.

As a senior in 2022, Roberts had 1,425 rushing yards and 14 rushing touchdowns through games played on November 19, 2022. Roberts was named the Mountain West conference's Offensive Player of the Year for 2022.

References

External links
 Air Force bio

Year of birth missing (living people)
Living people
American football running backs
Air Force Falcons football players
People from Arvada, Colorado
Players of American football from Colorado
Military personnel from Colorado